Herman Kleppa (born 17 September 1996) is a Norwegian footballer who plays as a midfielder for Sandnes Ulf.

In January 2021, he signed a three-year contract with Raufoss. After only half a season with the club, he joined Mjøndalen on 31 August 2021.

References

1996 births
Living people
Sportspeople from Stavanger
Norwegian footballers
Viking FK players
FK Vidar players
Sandnes Ulf players
Egersunds IK players
Raufoss IL players
Mjøndalen IF players
Association football midfielders
Eliteserien players
Norwegian First Division players
Norwegian Second Division players